FSUE Atomflot is a Russian company and service base that maintains the world's only fleet of nuclear-powered icebreakers. Atomflot is part of the Rosatom group, and is based in the city of Murmansk.

, the company operates a fleet of five nuclear-powered icebreakers, including the world's largest, the Arktika, which joined the fleet on her maiden voyage.

The company employs between 1,000 and 2,000 people. The company has a ship to transport radioactive waste, and another to monitor radiation. It also maintains a museum ship, the Lenin.

Activity 
A total of about 1,000 people work on atomic icebreakers, nuclear light carriers, and ATOs (atomic technology services), all under the umbrella of Atomflot.  The command staff undergoes special training at the Admiral Makarov State Maritime Academy in St. Petersburg. In addition to orchestrating cargo transportation along the Northern Sea Route, Atomflot organizes tourist cruises, the profit from which amounts to 6-7% of the company's total profit.

References

External links

Official Page

Rosatom
Shipping companies of Russia
Russian brands
Federal State Unitary Enterprises of Russia
Companies based in Murmansk Oblast